FUSE was a Toronto-based Canadian non-profit arts and culture periodical published by Artons Cultural Affairs Society and Publishing Inc. FUSE was one of Canada’s longest running alternative art publications. Throughout its 38 year history, the focus has been the interchange between art, media, and politics. The magazine published its final issue in Winter 2013, under the editorial direction of Gina Badger.

History
Centerfold, an arts newsprint magazine addressing the lack of critical discourse within artist-run culture, was founded in Calgary, Alberta, Canada in 1976. In 1978, Centerfold relocated to Toronto, and in 1980, the name of the magazine changed to FUSE. The focus of the magazine shifted from "an interdisciplinary artists" magazine to "a cultural news magazine". The publishers of FUSE incorporated as Artons Cultural Affairs Society and Publishing in 1984.

Founding editors 
Centerfold founding editors were Clive Robertson and Marcella Bienvenue. Continuing as FUSE after the November 1979 issue, the founding editors were Clive Robertson, Lisa Steele and Tom Sherman.

Contributors
Early contributors to the magazine include: 
 Bruce Barber
 Karl Beveridge
 Sara Diamond
 Richard Fung
 Peggy Gale
 John Greyson
 M. Nourbese Philip
 Tom Sherman
 Nell Tenhaaf
 Kim Tomczak

References

External links

Holdings at Artexte
Archives at Queen's University

1976 establishments in Alberta
2013 disestablishments in Ontario
Visual arts magazines published in Canada
Defunct magazines published in Canada
Magazines established in 1976
Magazines disestablished in 2013
Magazines published in Toronto
Magazines published in Alberta